Charles Vernon Oldfield Bartlett, CBE (30 April 1894 – 18 January 1983) was an English journalist, politician and author. He served as a Member of Parliament (MP) from 1938 to 1950: first as an Independent Progressive advocating a Popular Front, then for the Common Wealth Party, and then again as an Independent Progressive.

Life
Born at Westbury, Wiltshire, Bartlett was educated at Blundell's School, then joined the British Army during the First World War, from which he was invalided out. He became a journalist, working for the Daily Mail, and later was a foreign correspondent for The Times. In 1922 he was appointed director of the London office of the League of Nations, after which he worked as a news reporter  for BBC radio. He did not have his BBC contract renewed after his coverage of Hitler's decision to leave the League of Nations in 1933 was deemed too sympathetic ("not beastly enough"). In 1933 he joined the News Chronicle and was its diplomatic correspondent for twenty years, including a period in Spain during the Spanish Civil War.

Bartlett was elected to the House of Commons for the Somerset seat of Bridgwater as a Popular Front candidate opposed to appeasement in a by-election held on 18 November 1938. He held the seat for twelve years.

In 1942, Bartlett, Richard Acland, J. B. Priestley, and others established the socialist Common Wealth Party. At the 1945 election, Bartlett held his Bridgwater seat, standing as an Independent. In 1950 he joined the Labour Party and retired from parliament.

In 1954 Bartlett also retired from his work with the News Chronicle and moved to Singapore, where he was both political commentator for the Straits Times and also South East Asia correspondent for the Manchester Guardian.

Publications
Calf Love, 1929
Journey's End: a novel (with R. C. Sherriff), 1930 
Nazi Germany Explained, 1933
This is My Life, 1937
Tomorrow Always Comes, 1943
East of the Iron Curtain, 1950
Struggle for Africa, 1953
You and your surfboard, 1953
And Now, Tomorrow, 1960
Tuscan Retreat, 1964
A Book about Elba, 1965
Introduction to Italy, 1967
The Past of Pastimes, 1969
The Colour of their Skin, 1969
Tuscan Harvest, 1971
Central Italy, 1972
Northern Italy, 1973
I Know What I Liked, 1974

References

External links
 
 Summary of his life and works
 A short biography
 Vernon Bartlett website
 
 
 

1894 births
1983 deaths
Military personnel from Wiltshire
British Army personnel of World War I
20th-century British Army personnel
People from Westbury, Wiltshire
People educated at Blundell's School
Members of the Parliament of the United Kingdom for English constituencies
Daily Mail journalists
English male journalists
Independent politicians in England
The Times people
English socialists
Commanders of the Order of the British Empire
Common Wealth Party MPs
UK MPs 1935–1945
UK MPs 1945–1950
Common Wealth Party